Sir William John Jungwirth CMG (10 August 1897 in Richmond, Victoria, Australia - 25 January 1981 in Kew, Victoria, Australia) was an Australian public servant, serving various Victorian premiers.

Jungwirth received his knighthood in January 1957 for his handling of Duke of Edinburgh's visit for the 1956 Summer Olympics.

References

1897 births
1981 deaths
Australian public servants
Australian Knights Commander of the Order of St Michael and St George
Public servants from Melbourne
People from Richmond, Victoria